Ingrid Janbell (born May Ingrid Janbell on 4 August 1955 in Borås, Sweden) is a Swedish actress, director and lecturer.

Janbell has worked as a professional actress since 1977. Together with Louise Raeder she wrote a play called "Matdemonen" (The Demon of Food), about anorexia and bulimia, in 1992. Her first film debut was in 1979, in Jackie Söderman's Charlotte Löwensköld. She has had a recurring role as Virena in the Swedish detective film series Hassel.

Selection of filmography
2000 - Hassel - Förgörarna (Hassel - the destroyers)
1999 - Nya tider (New Times) (TV)
1992 - Hassel - Svarta banken (The black bank) (TV)
1989 - Hassel - Terrorns finger (The finger of terror) (TV)
1988 - Träpatronerna (The wooden cartridge) (TV)
1988 - Nya Dagbladet (The new Daily Paper) (TV)

References

External links

Swedish film directors
Swedish women film directors
Swedish television actresses
Swedish soap opera actresses
Living people
1955 births